Trimeresurus gunaleni, also known as Gunalen's pitviper, is a species of pit viper endemic to Sumatra (Indonesia). It is venomous.

References 

gunaleni
Snakes of Southeast Asia
Reptiles of Indonesia
Endemic fauna of Sumatra
Reptiles described in 2014